Brian Mahoney may refer to:

Brian Mahoney (footballer) (1952-), former footballer
Brian Mahoney (basketball) (1948-), retired college basketball coach

See also
Bryan Mahoney (disambiguation)